Loma Linda is a census-designated place (CDP) in San Patricio County, Texas, United States. The population was 122 at the 2010 census. Prior to the 2010 census Loma Linda was part of the Del Sol-Loma Linda CDP.

Geography
Loma Linda is located at  (28.007011, -97.499402).

References

Census-designated places in San Patricio County, Texas
Census-designated places in Texas
Corpus Christi metropolitan area